Parasemidalis is a genus of insects belonging to the family Coniopterygidae.

The species of this genus are found in Europe and Northern America.

Species:
 Parasemidalis alluaudina (Navás, 1912) 
 Parasemidalis enriquei Sziráki, 2009

References

Coniopterygidae
Neuroptera genera